Shah Mohammad Muhibbullah Babunagari (born 15 February 1934) is a Bangladeshi Deobandi Islamic scholar, Politician and Academician. He is the current and 3rd Amir of Hefazat-e-Islam Bangladesh, Rector of Al-Jamiatul Islamiah Azizul Uloom Babunagar. He also held leading positions in Islami Oikya Jote, Befaqul Madarisil Arabia Bangladesh and Al-Haiatul Ulya Lil-Jamiatil Qawmia Bangladesh. He is considered one of the pioneers of Deoband movement in Bangladesh.

Early life and family
Muhibullah was born on 15 February 1934 in the village of Babunagar in Fatikchhari Thana, Chittagong District, East Bengal, Pakistan (now Bangladesh) to a Bengali Muslim family of theologians. His father was Harun Babunagari, the founder of Al-Jamiatul Islamiah Azizul Uloom Babunagar, and his mother was Umme Salma. Babunagari was the eldest of 5 siblings. His paternal grandfather, Sufi Azizur Rahman, was one of the founders of Al-Jamiatul Ahlia Darul Ulum Moinul Islam in Hathazari, and traced his ancestry to Caliph Abu Bakr.

Education
Babunagari studied at his father's institute, Al-Jamiatul Islamiah Azizul Uloom Babunagar, until class 8 (Jamat-e-Chaharum). He then proceeded to study at the Al-Jamiatul Ahlia Darul Ulum Moinul Islam in Hathazari from class 9 (Hidayah Awwalain). Seeking to extend his Islamic studies to a further level, Babunagari left Bengal to enrol at the Darul Uloom Deoband in North India. In Deoband, Babunagari started from class 9 (Hidayah Awwalain) again. In 1959, he completed Hadith studies at the institute. He studied Hidayah Akhirain under Hussain Ahmed Madani, Sahih al-Bukhari under Syed Fakhruddin Ahmad, Sahih Muslim and Jami' al-Tirmidhi under Ibrahim Balyawi and Sunan Abu Dawood under Fakhrul Hasan.

Career
After returning to Bengal following his studies, Babunagari began teaching at Al-Jamiatul Islamiah Azizul Uloom Babunagar, and later became vice-principal.

On 15 November 2020, he was elected Chief Adviser to Hefazat-e-Islam Bangladesh. Earlier, he was the vice-president of this organization.

Politics
He was a Presidium member of Islami Andolan Bangladesh during the lifetime of Charmonai Pir Fazlul Karim. During the lifetime of Fazlul Haque Amini, he was associated with Islami Oikya Jote and Islamic Law Implementation Committee. Later he was elected vice-president of Islami Oikya Jote. He resigned from Islami Oikya Jote in 2018. Currently, he isn't directly associated with any political party.

Family
In family life, he is the father of 3 sons and 6 daughters.

See also
 Shah Ahmad Shafi
 Junaid Babunagari
 Mahmudul Hasan
 Syed Rezaul Karim
 Mamunul Haque

References

External links

Bangladeshi Islamic religious leaders
1935 births
Deobandis
20th-century Muslim scholars of Islam
Bangladeshi Sunni Muslim scholars of Islam
Darul Uloom Deoband alumni
Hanafis
Living people
People from Fatikchhari Upazila
20th-century Bengalis
21st-century Bengalis
Al-Jamiatul Islamiah Azizul Uloom Babunagar
Bangladeshi people of Arab descent
Bengali Muslim scholars of Islam